Kurt Widmer (born 28 December 1940) is a Swiss baritone and voice teacher, who has appeared internationally with a focus on concert singing.

Career 
Born in Wil, Canton of St. Gallen, Widmer studied violin and voice at the Zürich Conservatory with Ria Ginster, and took master classes with Franziska Martienssen-Lohmann and her husband Paul Lohmann in Lucerne and Wiesbaden.

From 1966, Widmer performed in concert in Switzerland and internationally. He was a soloist with Der Gemischte Chor Zürich between 1967 and 1992, in 24 oratorios and concerts. He toured in Europe, and also in Israel, Canada, Russia, Japan and the US, with conductors such as Rafael Frühbeck de Burgos, Michael Gielen, Paul Sacher, Wolfgang Sawallisch, Horst Stein and Jesús López Cobos. He sang in the premieres of more than hundred contemporary compositions.

From 1968, Widmer was a teacher at the City of Basel Music Academy. He held master classes in Bolzano, Kufstein, Linz, Moscow, Salzburg, Stuttgart, Tokyo, Trier, Vaduz and Vienna.

His son Oliver Widmer is also a notable baritone and the husband of Cecilia Bartoli.

Repertory 
 Domenico Cimarosa: Requiem
 Graun: Der Tod Jesu
 Haydn: Die Schöpfung
 Rimsky-Korsakov: Mozart und Salieri
 Saint-Saëns: Weihnachtsoratorium
 Othmar Schoeck: Penthesilea (Achilles)
 Schubert: Winterreise

Recordings 
 Bach: St John Passion (arias), EMI
 Beethoven: Missa solemnis, Harmonia Mundi
 Brahms: Ein deutsches Requiem, Harmonia Mundi
 Fauré: Requiem, Schwann AMS Studio
 François-Joseph Gossec: Requiem – Grande Messe des Morts, Erato Records
 Haydn: Die Jahreszeiten, Vox

Awards 
 1967: Solistenpreis des Schweizerischen Tonkünstlervereins
 1985: Regio Preis für Musik des Oberrhein–Vereins zur Förderung der Wirtschaft
 2007: Kulturpreis der Stadt Wil
 Prix mondial du Disque
 Grand Prix du Disque
 Diaposon d'or de l'Académie Prix du Disque Français
 Deutscher Schallplattenpreis
 Preis der Deutschen Schallplattenkritik

References

External links 
 
 Website von Kurt Widmer

Swiss baritones
1940 births
Living people